On My Way Out: The Secret Life of Nani and Popi is a Canadian short documentary film, directed by Brandon Gross and Skyler Gross and released in 2017. Profiling the filmmakers' grandparents, Holocaust survivors Ruth and Roman Blank, the film depicts their preparation for their 65th wedding anniversary, and focuses on their revelation to the rest of the family that Roman is gay and Ruth has always known this.

The film premiered at the 2017 Toronto International Film Festival.

Awards and nominations

 David Camera Award for Best Short Documentary at the 2018 Warsaw Jewish Film Festival
 Canadian Screen Award nomination for Best Short Documentary at the 7th Canadian Screen Awards in 2019.

References

External links
 

2017 films
2017 short documentary films
2017 LGBT-related films
Canadian short documentary films
Canadian LGBT-related short films
Documentary films about gay men
Documentary films about LGBT and Judaism
Jewish Canadian films
2010s English-language films
2010s Canadian films